is an interchange railway station in the city of Shimada, Shizuoka Prefecture, Japan, operated by Central Japan Railway Company (JR Central). The station is also used by the Ōigawa Railway.

Lines
Kanaya Station is served by the Tōkaidō Main Line, and is located 212.9 kilometers from the starting point of the line at Tokyo Station. It is also a terminus of the Ōigawa Railway’s Ōigawa Main Line and is 39.5 kilometers form the opposing terminus at Senzu Station.

Station layout
JR Kanaya Station has a two opposing side platforms serving Track 1 and Track 2 which are on headshunts, allowing for tracks for express trains to pass in between. The platforms are connected to the station building by an underpass. The station building has automated ticket machines, TOICA automated turnstiles and a staffed ticket office.

The adjacent Ōigawa Kanaya Station has a single side platform. The platform is equipped with Selective Door Operation, as trains longer than four cars in length are too long for the platform. The station originally was built with a terminal headshunt, which is no longer in existence.

Platforms

|-

Adjacent stations

|-
!colspan=5|Central Japan Railway Company

|-
!colspan=5|Ōigawa Railway

Station history
Kanaya Station was opened on May 16, 1890, a year after when the section of the Tōkaidō Main Line connecting Shizuoka with Hamamatsu was completed. The Ōigawa Railway service began on June 10, 1927. Regularly scheduled freight service was discontinued in 1971.

Station numbering was introduced to the section of the Tōkaidō Line operated JR Central in March 2018; Kanaya Station was assigned station number CA25.

Passenger statistics
In fiscal 2017, the JR portion station was used by an average of 2,019 passengers daily and the Ōigawa Railway portion by 277 passengers daily (boarding passengers only).

Surrounding area
Shizuoka Airport
Suwahara Castle ruins

See also
 List of Railway Stations in Japan

References

Yoshikawa, Fumio. Tokaido-sen 130-nen no ayumi. Grand-Prix Publishing (2002) .

External links

  

Railway stations in Japan opened in 1890
Railway stations in Shizuoka Prefecture
Tōkaidō Main Line
Stations of Central Japan Railway Company
Stations of Ōigawa Railway
Shimada, Shizuoka